The canton of Néronde is a French former administrative division located in the department of Loire and the Rhone-Alpes region. It was disbanded following the French canton reorganisation which came into effect in March 2015. It consisted of 10 communes, which joined the new canton of Le Coteau in 2015. It had 8,747 inhabitants (2012).

The canton comprised the following communes:

Balbigny
Bussières
Néronde
Pinay
Sainte-Agathe-en-Donzy
Sainte-Colombe-sur-Gand
Saint-Cyr-de-Valorges
Saint-Jodard
Saint-Marcel-de-Félines
Violay

See also
Cantons of the Loire department

References

Former cantons of Loire (department)
2015 disestablishments in France
States and territories disestablished in 2015